Golden Hoofs is a 1941 American comedy film directed by Lynn Shores and written by Ben Grauman Kohn. The film stars Jane Withers, Charles "Buddy" Rogers, Kay Aldridge, George Irving, Buddy Pepper and Cliff Clark. The film was released on February 14, 1941, by 20th Century Fox.

Plot

Having loved and trained horses since she was a little girl, Jane Drake is devastated when her dad Dr. Tim Drake's farm is sold to Dean MacArdle, who also intends to abandon the longtime tradition of harness racing to bring in "bangtails" to race.

Dean is kind enough to sell Jane her favorite trotter, Yankee Doodle, for just $5. While she and her dad Doc Drake nurse that horse back to health, she persuades Dean to enter Doodle's old stablemate, Yankee Clipper, in the upcoming "Hiatoga Stakes," hoping to change his mind about harness racing.

Jane is disappointed when Dean's snobby sweetheart Cornelia Hunt shows up. She decides to enter Yankee Doodle in the same race out of spite, but after Yankee Clipper wins instead, Dean demonstrates to Jane once more that his heart's in the right place.

Cast  
Jane Withers as Jane Drake
Charles "Buddy" Rogers as Dean MacArdle
Kay Aldridge as Cornelia Hunt
George Irving as Dr. Timothy Drake
Buddy Pepper as Morthy Witherspoon
Cliff Clark as Booth
Philip Hurlic as Mose
Sheila Ryan as Gwen
Howard Hickman as Calvin Harmon

References

External links 
 

1941 films
20th Century Fox films
American comedy films
1941 comedy films
Films directed by Lynn Shores
American black-and-white films
1940s English-language films
1940s American films